Abacetus barbieri is a species of ground beetle in the subfamily Pterostichinae. It was described by Straneo in 1961 and is an endemic species found in Vietnam.

References

barbieri
Beetles described in 1961
Insects of Southeast Asia